Szombathelyi Haladás is a professional football club based in Szombathely, Hungary.

Key

Nemzeti Bajnokság I
 Pld = Matches played
 W = Matches won
 D = Matches drawn
 L = Matches lost
 GF = Goals for
 GA = Goals against
 Pts = Points
 Pos = Final position

Hungarian football league system
 NBI = Nemzeti Bajnokság I 
 NBII = Nemzeti Bajnokság II 
 NBIII = Nemzeti Bajnokság III 
 MBI = Megyei Bajnokság I 

Magyar Kupa
 F = Final
 SF = Semi-finals
 QF = Quarter-finals
 R16 = Round of 16
 R32 = Round of 32
 R64 = Round of 64
 R128 = Round of 128

UEFA
 F = Final
 SF = Semi-finals
 QF = Quarter-finals
 Group = Group stage
 PO = Play-offs
 QR3 = Third qualifying round
 QR2 = Second qualifying round
 QR1 = First qualifying round
 PR = Preliminary round

Seasons
As of 11 July 2018

Notes
 Note 1: Play-off Videoton FC 7–1 Haladás, and Haladás 3–1 Videoton FC
 Note 2: Relegation play-off: Oroszlányi Bányász 2–0 Haladás on 18 June 1989, Haladás 4–1 Oroszlányi Bányász on 24 June 1989.
 Note 3: Attila Kuttor as interim manager

References

External links

Szombathelyi Haladás
Szombathelyi Haladás